The 1979 winners of the Torneo di Viareggio (in English, the Viareggio Tournament, officially the Viareggio Cup World Football Tournament Coppa Carnevale), the annual youth football tournament held in Viareggio, Tuscany, are listed below.

Format
The 16 teams are seeded in 4 groups. Each team from a group meets the others in a single tie. The winner of each group progress to the final knockout stage.

Participating teams

Italian teams

  Fiorentina
  Inter Milan
  Juventus
  Lanerossi Vicenza
  Milan
  Napoli
  Perugia
  Pistoiese
  Roma

European teams

  Wisła Kraków
  OFK Beograd
  Atlético Madrid
  Celtic
  Rijeka

American teams
  Mexico City
Asian teams
  Hebei

Group stage

Group A

Group B

Group C

Group D

Knockout stage

Champions

Footnotes

External links
 Official Site (Italian)
 Results on RSSSF.com

1979
1978–79 in Italian football
1978–79 in Yugoslav football
1978–79 in Polish football
1978–79 in Spanish football
1978–79 in Czechoslovak football
1978–79 in Scottish football
1978–79 in Mexican football
1979 in Chinese football